Cola greenwayi, commonly known as hairy cola or Zulu coshwood, is a species of flowering plant in the family Malvaceae. It was first described in 1956 by the British botanist John Patrick Micklethwait Brenan. It is native to southeastern Africa.

Description
The smaller branches and twigs are brown and densely hairy at first. They are stalked, simple, elliptical or oblanceolate, and have prominent veins. There is a hairy swelling known as a pulvinus at the base of each leaf-blade, which acts as a hinge. The flowers are in clusters growing in the axils of the leaves. They have small, rusty-brown, hairy bracts. The calyx has four to six lobes and there are no petals. The four to five carpels turn yellowish-orange when ripe, making a sub-globose fruit, hairy at first, and later with a thin, brittle rind. It usually contains one or two seeds.

Distribution and habitat
This tree is native to southeastern Africa, its range extending from Kenya and Tanzania southwards to Zimbabwe and Mozambique, Transvaal and eastern KwaZulu-Natal. It is also part of the typical flora of the Southern African Sand Forest which grows on ancient sand dunes on the border of northern KwaZulu-Natal and southern Mozambique.

References

External links
 

greenwayi
Flora of South Africa
Plants described in 1956
Afromontane flora